Hermann Höcherl (31 March 1912 – 18 May 1989) was a German politician of the Christian Social Union in Bavaria (CSU). He served as Federal Ministry of the Interior from 1961 to 1965 and as Federal Minister for Food, Agriculture and Forests from 1965 to 1969.

Life
Höcherl was born in Brennberg near Regensburg, Bavaria, but was raised by his grandfather near Roding. Having obtained his Abitur degree in 1931, he studied law at the Berlin Frederick William University, at Aix-Marseille University, and at the Ludwig Maximilian University of Munich. He passed the Second State Examination in 1938 and first served as a Gerichtsassessor, from 1940 as a public prosecutor in Regensburg.

He had joined the Nazi Party in 1931; after leaving it in 1932, he rejoined in 1935. In 1942 he volunteered for the Wehrmacht armed forces in the rank of Lieutenant, with his service being in Nazi occupied Poland, and later in combat in Greece, Finland and Soviet Russia.

After the war, Höcherl from 1948 practised as a lawyer. In 1950 he was again appointed public prosecutor in Deggendorf and judge in Regensburg in 1951.

Höcherl joined the Christian Social Union in 1949. He soon became a board member in the Upper Palatinate district and in 1952 also a member of the state executive committee. Höcherl was first elected to the Bundestag in 1953, representing Regensburg.

Upon the 1961 federal election, he became Minister of the Interior in the cabinet of Chancellor Konrad Adenauer and retained this office, when Adenauer was succeeded by Ludwig Erhard in 1963. After the 1965 election, he was appointed Minister for Food, Agriculture and Forests and held this office in the grand coalition government of Chancellor Kurt Georg Kiesinger until 1969. His term of office as Interior Minister was overshadowed by a bugging affair at the Federal Office for the Protection of the Constitution in 1963.

References

1912 births
1989 deaths
Agriculture ministers of Germany
Nazi Party politicians
Federal government ministers of Germany
Interior ministers of Germany
Members of the Bundestag for Bavaria
Members of the Bundestag 1972–1976
Members of the Bundestag 1969–1972
Members of the Bundestag 1965–1969
Members of the Bundestag 1961–1965
Members of the Bundestag 1957–1961
Members of the Bundestag 1953–1957
German Army officers of World War II
People from the Kingdom of Bavaria
People from Regensburg (district)
Grand Crosses 1st class of the Order of Merit of the Federal Republic of Germany
Members of the Bundestag for the Christian Social Union in Bavaria